Claudio Suárez Sánchez (born 17 December 1968) is a Mexican former professional footballer who played as a centre-back.

Nicknamed El Emperador (The Emperor).

Club career
Born in Texcoco, State of Mexico and nicknamed El Emperador ("The Emperor"), Suárez began his club career with UNAM, where he played from 1988 to 1996 where he became champion in 1991. He moved to Guadalajara as an important piece for the 1996 Apertura, and remained there for 3 years, through the 1999 Clausura where he became champion in the Verano 1997 tournament, and was called to the 1998 FIFA World Cup. After being in the All Mexican Team, as an important and solid defender he was transferred to Tigres.

Suárez then moved on to Tigres UANL, where he played from 1999 to the end of 2005. He led the team's defense during that time, and was league runner-up twice, in 2001 and 2003. His last game with Tigres, and in the Mexico league, was a semi-final Clásico Regiomontano in which he was sent off in a controversial referee decision. Previous to this incident, he already had disagreements with the team's management. Tigre's directive organization had asked Suarez to retire for years and join the management, but Suarez had refused. Other differences in defensive style were also cause for conflict with the team's management. The semi-final was the last excuse for separation.

In 2006, he moved to Major League Soccer to play for Chivas USA.

On 8 March 2009, after negotiations with his contract fell, Suarez announced his retirement. However, on 20 March 2009, he decided to return to professional soccer for another year. He was the last active soccer player left from Mexico's 1994 FIFA World Cup squad until he announced his retirement on 26 March 2010.

On 5 September 2010, Suárez came out of retirement to play for the Carolina Railhawks in an exhibition game with the Pumas Morelos.

International career
Suárez was a member and starter for the senior national team in the 1994 FIFA World Cup in the United States as well as the 1998 FIFA World Cup in France. He missed 2002 FIFA World Cup due to injury before the tournament began, but was picked to go to the 2006 FIFA World Cup in Germany. This FIFA World Cup meant his third World Cup in his career. Despite being picked for the squad he saw no action, but he did wear his legendary number 2 jersey.

He captained the national team for many years and officially represented Mexico 177 times (178 in Mexican record keeping) making him the 2nd player with the most caps in history for the Mexico national football team.

On 25 March 2007, Suárez along with former national team and Chivas USA teammate Ramón Ramírez were honored in a friendly against Paraguay at Estadio Universitario.

He was selected as one of 3 overage players on the Mexico Olympic team at the 1996 Summer Olympics.

Personal life
Suárez currently resides in Southern California with his wife and three children, and works as a commentator for Fox Deportes.

Driving the streets of Los Angeles, Claudio occasionally meets other celebrities and minor celebrities such as Etienne Rosas lead vocals for The Revies rockband.

Career statistics

Club

International goals
Scores and results list Mexico's goal tally first, score column indicates score after each Suárez goal.

Honours
UNAM
Mexican Primera División: 1990–91
CONCACAF Champions' Cup: 1989

Guadalajara
Mexican Primera División:  Verano 1997

UANL
InterLiga: 2005

Chivas USA
Western Conference (Regular Season): 2007

Mexico
FIFA Confederations Cup: 1999
CONCACAF Gold Cup: 1993, 1996, 1998

Individual
IFFHS CONCACAF Men's Team of All Time: 2021

See also
List of men's footballers with 100 or more international caps

References

External links

Claudio Suárez Interview 
Football Database.com provides Claudio Suárez's profile and stats
Profile and Statistics 
Biography

1968 births
Living people
People from Texcoco, State of Mexico
Mexico international footballers
Mexican expatriate footballers
Mexican footballers
Association football defenders
Club Universidad Nacional footballers
C.D. Guadalajara footballers
Tigres UANL footballers
Chivas USA players
Liga MX players
Major League Soccer players
1993 Copa América players
1993 CONCACAF Gold Cup players
1994 FIFA World Cup players
1995 King Fahd Cup players
1995 Copa América players
1996 CONCACAF Gold Cup players
1997 FIFA Confederations Cup players
1997 Copa América players
1998 CONCACAF Gold Cup players
1998 FIFA World Cup players
1999 Copa América players
1999 FIFA Confederations Cup players
2000 CONCACAF Gold Cup players
2004 Copa América players
2006 FIFA World Cup players
CONCACAF Gold Cup-winning players
FIFA Confederations Cup-winning players
Footballers at the 1996 Summer Olympics
Olympic footballers of Mexico
Expatriate soccer players in the United States
Mexican expatriate sportspeople in the United States
FIFA Century Club